Star Wars Theory is a Canadian YouTube channel with 3.32 million subscribers, and is a self-described "Star Wars fan making content for other Star Wars fans". Its creator commonly known as "Toos", began his YouTube channel in 2016 making videos about the Star Wars film franchise.

Content
As the name suggests, the channel originally began with "Theory" (his nickname) presenting theories regarding the mysteries that were set up by Star Wars: The Force Awakens. From there, the channel has grown and evolved over the years, with recurring motifs and series such as Star Wars Explained, a narration of many of the Star Wars comics, animated (and often humorous) fan fictions, and many others. His 2018 fan film Vader Episode I: Shards of the Past has received praise from among the Star Wars fanbase and has been viewed over 23 million times on YouTube as of April 2021.

One of the features of his channel is to make predictions in Star Wars media.

Online response 

In December 2020, Star Wars Theory was involved in a controversy with Lucasfilm Story Group executive Pablo Hidalgo. Hidalgo was criticized for privately tweeting "emotions are not for sharing", allegedly mocking Star Wars Theory’s emotional YouTube video reaction to the season 2 finale of The Mandalorian. After the tweet became public, Hidalgo apologized and clarified that the tweet was meant to be sarcastic.

Interviews 

 Roger Christian, who won an Academy Award for set decoration for the original Star Wars film
 Alan Dean Foster, Star Wars novelist.
 Emily Swallow who played The Armorer in The Mandalorian
 Gary Whitta screenwriter for Rogue One
 Kevin J. Anderson Star Wars novelists and comic book writer
 Paul Duncan writer of The Star Wars Archives 
 Phil Tippett creator of various characters and creatures in Star Wars.
 Michael A. Stackpole Star Wars novelist.
 Voice actors who worked on Star Wars animation and video games: Stephen Stanton, Sam Witwer, James Arnold Taylor, and Ashley Eckstein.
 Matthew Stover Star Wars novelist
 Paul Hirsch film editor on the first two Star Wars films
 Nick Gillard stunt coordinator and swordmaster for Star Wars Prequel Trilogy

References

External links
Official website
YouTube
Twitter
Instagram

Star Wars
YouTube channels
Canadian YouTubers